William Dowse (1770 – February 18, 1813 in Cooperstown, Oswego County, New York) was an American lawyer and politician from New York.

Life
Dowse was elected as a Federalist to the United States House of Representatives in the 15th District, but died before his term began.

At the time of Dowse's death, William G. Angel was a clerk in his office.

See also
List of members-elect of the United States House of Representatives who never took their seats

Notes

1770 births
1813 deaths
Elected officials who died without taking their seats
Federalist Party members of the United States House of Representatives from New York (state)
People from Cooperstown, New York